Thomas Elliot (born 18 June 1979) is a Caymanian footballer who plays as a defender. He  has represented the Cayman Islands during World Cup qualifying matches in 2004 and 2008.

Career statistics

International goals
Scores and results list the Cayman Islands' goal tally first.

References

1979 births
Living people
Association football defenders
Caymanian footballers
Sunset FC players
Scholars International players
Cayman Islands Premier League players
Cayman Islands international footballers